Wig Out at Jagbags is the sixth studio album by Stephen Malkmus and the Jicks.  It was released on January 7, 2014, by Matador Records.

Critical response

Upon initial release the album generally received positive reviews, attaining an aggregated score of 74 out of 100 on Metacritic. At Alternative Press, Jeff Rosenstock wrote that although "[f]earlessly skating all over the landscape of American rock music could lead lesser bands into a confusing disconnected record", the album "is full of so much life and melody that it stands as a refreshing alternative to the increasingly homogeneous state of indie rock."

Track listing
 "Planetary Motion" - 3:05
 "The Janitor Revealed" - 3:36
 "Lariat" - 3:06
 "Houston Hades" - 4:47
 "Shibboleth" - 2:45
 "J Smoov" - 5:07
 "Rumble at the Rainbo" - 1:42
 "Chartjunk" - 3:50
 "Independence Street" - 3:01
 "Scattegories" - 1:54
 "Cinnamon and Lesbians" - 3:02
 "Surreal Teenagers" - 5:39

References

Stephen Malkmus albums
2014 albums
Matador Records albums
Domino Recording Company albums
Albums produced by Beck